São Sebastião (Portuguese for "Saint Sebastian") may refer to:

Places

Brazil
 São Sebastião, Alagoas
 São Sebastião, São Paulo
 São Sebastião Island, the main island of the nearby archipelago city of Ilhabela, São Paulo
 São Sebastião da Amoreira, Paraná
 São Sebastião da Bela Vista, Minas Gerais
 São Sebastião da Boa Vista, Pará
 São Sebastião da Grama, São Paulo
 São Sebastião da Vargem Alegre, Minas Gerais
 São Sebastião de Lagoa de Roça, Paraíba
 São Sebastião do Alto, Rio de Janeiro
 São Sebastião do Anta, Minas Gerais
 São Sebastião do Caí, Rio Grande do Sul
 São Sebastião do Maranhão, Minas Gerais
 São Sebastião do Oeste, Minas Gerais
 São Sebastião do Paraíso, Minas Gerais
 São Sebastião do Passé, Bahia
 São Sebastião do Rio Preto, Minas Gerais
 São Sebastião do Rio Verde, Minas Gerais
 São Sebastião do Tocantins, Tocantins
 São Sebastião do Uatumã, Amazonas
 São Sebastião do Umbuzeiro, Paraíba

Portugal
 São Sebastião (Guimarães), a civil parish in the municipality of Guimarães
 São Sebastião (Lagos), a civil parish in the municipality of Lagos
 São Sebastião (Loulé), a civil parish in the municipality of Loulé
 São Sebastião (Rio Maior), a civil parish in the municipality of Rio Maior
 São Sebastião (Setúbal), a civil parish in the municipality of Setúbal
 São Sebastião da Pedreira, a former civil parish in the municipality of Lisbon
 São Sebastião (Lisbon Metro), a railway station
 São Sebastião (Ponta Delgada), a civil parish in the municipality of Ponta Delgada, Azores
 Vila de São Sebastião, a civil parish in the municipality of Angra do Heroísmo, Azores

São Tomé and Príncipe
 São Sebastião Museum

Other uses
 São Sebastião River (disambiguation)
 The full traditional name of the city of Rio de Janeiro is São Sebastião do Rio de Janeiro

See also
 Sebastião (disambiguation)
 San Sebastian (disambiguation)
 Saint-Sébastien (disambiguation)